State Route 860 (SR 860) is a state highway in southern Pershing County, Nevada. It runs  from a cattle guard at Derby Field to a frontage road along Interstate 80 (FR PE01/Old U.S. Route 40). Between its two termini, SR 860 intersects with the southern terminus of SR 397.

Major junctions

See also

References

860
Transportation in Pershing County, Nevada